Michael Brett Adkisson (March 2, 1964 – April 12, 1987) was an American professional wrestler under the ring name Mike Von Erich. His four brothers, David, Kerry, Kevin and Chris, also wrestled. He was the son of longtime Texas wrestler and wrestling promoter Fritz Von Erich and a member of the Von Erich family.

Early life 
Mike had five brothers: David, Kerry, Kevin, Jack  and Chris. His father, longtime Texas wrestler and wrestling promoter, Fritz Von Erich, trained all his sons in professional wrestling. Several wrestlers associated with Mike, such as his brother Kevin, King Kong Bundy, "Gentleman" Chris Adams, Gary Hart and Jake Roberts, have all stated that he never wanted to be a wrestler. Instead, he wanted to work for his father's company, World Class Championship Wrestling (WCCW), as a cameraman. He knew how to play the guitar and wanted to be a musician.

Professional wrestling career

World Class Championship Wrestling (1983–1987) 
Mike made his debut on November 24, 1983, winning a match against Skandor Akbar during "WCCW Wrestling Star Wars" at the Reunion Arena. He was then involved in several encounters with The Freebirds. Von Erich and Michael Hayes brawled on October 17, 1983, in Ft. Worth, after Hayes ripped a jacket given to Mike by his brother Kerry. Mike teamed up with his brother Kevin against Terry Gordy and Buddy Roberts on December 25, 1983. The only time Mike ever teamed up with his brother David was in January 1984 when, along with Kerry, they battled the Freebirds. Mike took David's place teaming with Kerry after David's death in February 1984.

WCCW tried to give Mike a feud of his own against Brian Adias in October 1986, since Kerry was out of wrestling with an ankle injury. Mike and Adias were to battle in a match at Parade of Champions on May 3, 1987, but Mike died on April 12 of that year. His final match took place at the Sportatorium on April 3, 1987, against Mike Williams.

New Japan Pro-Wrestling (1987) 
While wrestling for World Class, Mike ventured to Japan for the first and only time in his career, to wrestle for New Japan Pro-Wrestling in January 1987, during their New Year Dash series tour. Even though he didn't wrestle for very long on that tour, Mike had a strong encounter with then IWGP Junior Heavyweight Champion Shiro Koshinaka, facing him on January 3, in a losing effort. He also teamed with fellow foreigners such as Tony St. Clair, Black Bart, Konga The Barbarian and The Cuban Assassin against the likes of Antonio Inoki, Tatsumi Fujinami, Osamu Kido and Yoshiaki Fujiwara. However, he also enjoyed some success in it, scoring victories against veteran Kantaro Hoshino, young lion Shunji Kosugi and South Korean wrestler Kim Su Hong. After wrestling for 10 days in their tour, Mike returned home to America.

Personal life 
Mike was married on February 14, 1985, to Shani Garza. He was a born-again Christian.

He underwent shoulder surgery on August 22, 1985, due to an injury suffered during a wrestling tour of Israel. He was later diagnosed with toxic shock syndrome. He suffered some brain damage as a result of his illness and lost a great deal of weight.

In 1986, he suffered head injuries from a car accident in which his vehicle overturned after he lost control. In addition, Kevin cited an incident in which Mike attacked a streetlight in frustration over his current condition. Kevin once said that Mike also suffered from the pressure of having to "be David" after his brother's death. Since the beginning of his career, the pressure was on for Mike to succeed on the same level as his brothers.

Death 
On April 12, 1987, Mike left a suicide note for his family, then went to Lewisville Lake, where he drank alcohol and overdosed on the sleeping aid Placidyl. A few days before his death, Mike had been arrested after a DUI. His body was found four days later and buried at Grove Hill Memorial Park in Dallas.

Championships and accomplishments 
Pro Wrestling Illustrated
PWI Most Inspirational Wrestler of the Year (1985)
PWI Rookie of the Year (1984)
PWI ranked him #288 of the top 500 singles wrestlers of the "PWI Years" in 2003
PWI ranked him #23 of the top 100 tag teams of the "PWI Years" with David, Kevin, and Kerry Von Erich in 2003
World Class Championship Wrestling
NWA American Heavyweight Championship (1 time)
NWA World Six-Man Tag Team Championship (Texas version) (4 times) – with Kerry and Kevin Von Erich (3), Kevin and Lance Von Erich (1)
WCCW Middle Eastern Championship (1 time)
World Wrestling Entertainment
WWE Hall of Fame (Class of 2009)
Wrestling Observer Newsletter
Feud of the Year (1983, 1984) with Kerry and Kevin Von Erich vs. The Fabulous Freebirds
Match of the Year (1984) with Kerry Von Erich and Kevin Von Erich vs. The Fabulous Freebirds in an Anything Goes match on July 4
Worst Wrestler (1986)

See also 
 List of premature professional wrestling deaths

References

External links 
 
 

1964 births
1987 suicides
Sportspeople from Dallas
American male professional wrestlers
Drug-related suicides in Texas
Von Erich family
Alcohol-related deaths in Texas
WWE Hall of Fame inductees
Professional wrestlers from Texas
20th-century American male actors
20th-century professional wrestlers